Umbare Navalakh is a village Mawal taluka of Pune district in the state of Maharashtra, India.

Administration 
The village is administrated by a sarpanch, an elected representative who leads a gram panchayat. In 2019, the village was not itself listed as a seat of a gram panchayat, meaning that the local administration was shared with one or more other villages.

Demographics 
At the 2011 Census of India, the village comprised 594 households. The population of 3064 was split between 1617 males and 1447 females.

See also 
List of villages in Mawal taluka

References 

Villages in Mawal taluka